Kentucky elected its members August 3, 1818.

See also 
 1818 and 1819 United States House of Representatives elections
 List of United States representatives from Kentucky

Notes 

1818
Kentucky
United States House of Representatives